Renaud Barbaras (born 27 August 1955) is a French contemporary philosopher. An École normale supérieure de Saint-Cloud alumnus, he is Chair of Contemporary Philosophy in the University of Paris 1, Sorbonne.

Work 
A phenomenologist, Barbaras' works have primarily focused on the philosophies of Edmund Husserl and Maurice Merleau-Ponty. More recently, his readings of Czech philosopher Jan Patočka have influenced him into conceiving a phenomenology of life and accordingly, a cosmology in which man's place is to be thought anew.

In 1999, Renaud Barbaras built his philosophy in confrontation with the aporias of the philosophy of the late Merleau-Ponty, the philosopher he worked on for his PhD. His doctoral thesis, subtitled "an introduction to a phenomenology of perception" is in homage to Merleau-Ponty. Barbaras' Desire and distance addresses the consequences of the Abschattungslehre that neither Husserl nor Merleau-Ponty managed to clarify: his idea is to be faithful to the principle according to which the fact that we only perceive one side of the things around us doesn't mean we don't perceive them as themselves. This is what he calls not submitting perception to the law of object (or objectivity): the mistake he spots is the prejudice we have in our way of perceiving as imperfect in comparison with the supposed plenitude of the things themselves. But to be consequential would be to acknowledge the fact that nothing can appear if not to a subject. This doesn't mean that the subject is constituting the object, but merely that he is a part of the process of manifestation. To be a part of and not to be constituting: this requires a new definition of subjectivity, which Barbaras tries to give through the conception of a subject based on the natural movement and what he calls desire:
"We began our inquiry on the being of the intramondaneous subject with the relation, phenomenologically attested, between perception and movement. Now, this relation no longer represents any difficulty. It is plainly justified by the fact desire consists in experiencing its own limits. Indeed, since perception is only possible through the limitation of a totality, every perception essentially calls for its overtaking by a movement. Perceiving, in the end, is always passing to something else. And this doesn't only mean that a perception may give way to another perception, but that perception consists in giving way to something else because, since perception is desire, a reality is only to be grasped as something essentially missing."

Bibliography 
 De l'être du phénomène. Sur l'ontologie de Merleau-Ponty, Grenoble, J. Millon, « Krisis », 1991.
English translation by Ted Toadvine and Leonard Lawlor, The Being of the Phenomenon: Merleau-Ponty's Ontology, Indiana University Press, 2004.
 La Perception. Essai sur le sensible, Paris, Hatier, « Optiques, Philosophie », 1994. Rééd. Paris, Vrin, 2009.
 Merleau-Ponty, Paris, Ellipses, « Philo-Philosophes », 1997.
 Le tournant de l'expérience. Recherches sur la philosophie de Merleau-Ponty, Paris, Vrin, « Histoire de la philosophie », 1998.
 Le désir et la distance. Introduction à une phénoménologie de la perception, Paris, Vrin, « Problèmes et controverses », 1999.
English translation by Paul B. Milan, Desire and Distance: Introduction to a Phenomenology of Perception, Stanford University Press, 2005.
 Vie et intentionnalité. Recherches phénoménologiques, Paris, Vrin, 2003.
 Introduction à la philosophie de Husserl, Éditions de la Transparnce, 2004.
 Le mouvement de l'existence. Études sur la phénoménologie de Jan Patočka, Éditions de la Transparence, 2007.
 Introduction à une phénoménologie de la vie, Paris, Vrin, 2008. English translation by Leonard Lawlor as Introduction to a Phenomenology of Life forthcoming with Indiana University Press, 2022.
 L'ouverture du monde: Lecture de Jan Patočka, Editions de la Transparence, 25 août 2011
 La vie lacunaire, Paris, Vrin, 19 septembre 2011

Articles translated in English 

 2012 The Phenomenology of Life: Desire as the Being of the Subject. The Oxford Handbook of Contemporary Phenomenology      

 2008 (with Jen McWeeny) Life, Movement, and Desire., Research in Phenomenology 38 (1):3-17.
 2004 Affectivity and Movement: The Sense of Sensing in Erwin Straus. Phenomenology and the Cognitive Sciences 3 (2):215-228.
 2002 Francisco Varela: A New Idea of Perception and Life. Phenomenology and the Cognitive Sciences 1 (2):127-132

Notes

References 
 Renaud Barbaras' resume on Sorbonne website

1955 births
20th-century French non-fiction writers
20th-century French philosophers
21st-century French non-fiction writers
21st-century French philosophers
Continental philosophers
Epistemologists
French anthropologists
French male non-fiction writers
Living people
Metaphysicians
Ontologists
Phenomenologists
Philosophers of mind
Philosophers of psychology
Philosophical cosmologists
Philosophy academics
Philosophy writers
Writers from Paris